City block may refer to:

 City block, an area of a city surrounded by streets
 City Block (Judge Dredd), a part of the fictional universe recounted in the Judge Dredd comix
 Taxicab geometry or city block distance, a special case of the Minkowski distance